Ellen Rona Barkin (born April 16, 1954) is an American actress and a producer. Her breakthrough role was in the 1982 film Diner, and in the following years, she had starring roles in films such as Tender Mercies (1983), Eddie and the Cruisers (1983), The Adventures of Buckaroo Banzai Across the 8th Dimension (1984), The Big Easy (1986), Johnny Handsome, and Sea of Love (both 1989).

In 1991, for her leading role in the film Switch, Barkin received a Golden Globe nomination for Best Actress. Her subsequent film credits include: Man Trouble, Into the West (both 1992), This Boy's Life (1993), Bad Company, Wild Bill  (both 1995), The Fan (1996), Fear and Loathing in Las Vegas (1998), Drop Dead Gorgeous (1999), Crime and Punishment in Suburbia (2000), Palindromes (2004), Trust the Man (2005), Ocean's Thirteen (2007), Brooklyn's Finest (2009), and The Cobbler (2014).
 
In 1998, Barkin received a Primetime Emmy Award for her performance in the television film Before Women Had Wings. In 2011, she received the Tony Award for Best Featured Actress in a Play for her Broadway theatre debut in The Normal Heart. From 2016 until 2019, she played the leading role of Janine "Smurf" Cody on the TNT drama series Animal Kingdom. From 2012 until 2013, she played the leading role of Jane Forrest on the NBC sitcom The New Normal. 

Her producing credits include the films Letters to Juliet, Shit Year (both 2010), and Another Happy Day (2011).

Early life
Barkin was born in The Bronx, New York, the daughter of Evelyn (née Rozin), a hospital administrator who worked at Jamaica Hospital, and Sol Barkin, a chemical salesman. Her family was Jewish; they had emigrated from Siberia and the Russian–Polish border.

Barkin lived in Flushing, New York, and attended Parsons Junior High School. She received her high-school diploma at Manhattan's High School of Performing Arts. She then attended Hunter College and double majored in history and drama. At one point, Barkin wanted to teach ancient history. She continued her acting education at New York City's Actors Studio. According to Time, she studied acting for 10 years before landing her first audition.

Career

Her break-out role was in the comedy-drama film Diner (1982), written and directed by Barry Levinson, for which she received favorable reviews. Barkin was cast in the drama film Tender Mercies (1983) after impressing its director Bruce Beresford during an audition in New York City, despite her inexperience and his lack of familiarity with her work.  Robert Duvall, who played the lead role in Tender Mercies, said of Barkin, "She brings a real credibility to that part, plus she was young and attractive and had a certain sense of edge, a danger to her that was good for that part." She also appeared in the 1983 rock and roll drama film Eddie and the Cruisers.

Barkin later appeared in several successful films, including the thrillers The Big Easy (1987), opposite Dennis Quaid and Sea of Love (1989), opposite Al Pacino. Barkin also appeared in off-Broadway plays, including a role as one of the roommates in Extremities, about an intended rape victim played by Susan Sarandon who turns the tables on her attacker. About her performance in the play Eden Court, The New York Times critic Frank Rich summarized: "If it were really possible to give the kiss of life to a corpse, the actress Ellen Barkin would be the one to do it. In Eden Court, the moribund play that has brought her to the Promenade Theater, Miss Barkin is tantalizingly alive from her bouncing blond ponytail to the long legs that gyrate wildly and involuntarily every time an Elvis Presley record plays on stage".

Barkin has also done work in made-for-television films such as Before Women Had Wings (1997), for which she won an Emmy as Outstanding Lead Actress in a Miniseries or Movie and The White River Kid (1999). She voiced the start of each Theme Time Radio Hour with host Bob Dylan on XM's Deep Tracks. In 2005, Barkin set up a film production company with her brother, George, along with her husband at the time and billionaire investor, Ronald Perelman.

Barkin appeared in her Broadway debut as Dr. Brookner in The Normal Heart, for which she won the 2011 Tony Award for Best Featured Actress in a Play. Barkin has received acclaim for her performance in Another Happy Day. IndieWire cited her turn as one of the best female performances of the year. In 2015, she starred as Dani Kirschenbloom, in the Showtime comedy-drama series Happyish.

From 2016 through 2019, Barkin starred as Janine "Smurf" Cody, the crime family's matriarch, in the TNT drama series Animal Kingdom. The series is based on the 2010 Australian film where Smurf was played by Jacki Weaver.

Personal life
Barkin was the third party in the 1985 breakup of Eric Roberts and Sandy Dennis. She is the mother of two children, Jack Daniel (born 1989) and Romy Marion (born 1992), from her marriage to actor Gabriel Byrne. The two separated in 1993 and divorced in 1999, but are still close. Byrne even attended Barkin's 2000 wedding to multibillionaire and businessman Ronald Perelman. According to New York magazine, that marriage ended in divorce in 2006. 

In 1998, Barkin had a relationship with actor Johnny Depp whom she worked with on Fear and Loathing in Las Vegas. From 2008 to 2011, Barkin dated filmmaker Sam Levinson. 

In October 2006, "Magnificent Jewels from the Collection of Ellen Barkin" were sold for $20,369,200 at Christie's, New York. In 2007, Barkin sued Perelman for $3.4 million in investment funds he allegedly promised to invest in their film production company. He was ordered to pay her $4.3 million.

Barkin has a brother, George, who was formerly the editor-in-chief of National Lampoon and High Times.

Filmography

Film

Television

References

External links

 
 
 
 
 

1954 births
Living people
Actresses from New York City
American film actresses
American stage actresses
American television actresses
Actors Studio alumni
Hunter College alumni
American people of Russian-Jewish descent
Jewish American actresses
Jewellery collectors
People from the Bronx
Outstanding Performance by a Lead Actress in a Miniseries or Movie Primetime Emmy Award winners
Tony Award winners
Fiorello H. LaGuardia High School alumni
Theatre World Award winners
20th-century American Jews
21st-century American Jews
20th-century American actresses
21st-century American actresses